Carl Trask (born 10 February 1974) is a New Zealand cricketer. He played in one List A match for Central Districts in 1999/00.

See also
 List of Central Districts representative cricketers

References

External links
 

1974 births
Living people
New Zealand cricketers
Central Districts cricketers
People from Levin, New Zealand